The Nonproliferation Policy Education Center (NPEC) is an American nonpartisan think tank founded in 1994 to educate policymakers, the media, and academics about how to control the proliferation of weapons of mass destruction (WMD). NPEC's policy papers urge the United States government to pursue a harder line with potential proliferators of nuclear arms, in contrast to the more "upbeat view" that the risks of nuclear weapons proliferation can be safely managed as nuclear energy programs become more widespread.

Programs 
Each year, the NPEC Public Policy Fellowship is offered to young and mid-career government professionals to provide a rigorous understanding of how and why nuclear proliferation occurs. As of February 2018, roughly 150 professionals had completed the course, and were working for both Democratic and Republic members of Congress, staffing committees, and working for the State Department and the Pentagon. In addition, NPEC offers a Space Policy Course taught by space policy practitioners and experts.

Funding 
A nonpartisan, nonprofit educational research organization, NPEC has received funding from foundations including the MacArthur Foundation, which awarded 8 grants totalling $2,992,000 between 2008 and 2021. NPEC has also received funding from the Carnegie Corporation of New York.

Policy stances and commentary 
The NPEC website (npolicy.org) has been called a "goldmine" of information related to the sources of fissile material. Henry D. Sokolski, the founder and executive director of NPEC, has argued that the current controls for nuclear nonproliferation must be tightened, and that government leaders are not treating the issue of nuclear weapons proliferation with sufficient urgency. While Sokolski has suggested in the past that the United States should distinguish between "progressive and illiberal regimes" in its approach to nonproliferation policy, he has also warned that the U.S. should avoid incentivizing allies such as Japan and South Korea to increase nuclear fuel production. Facts on File has described Sokolski as "hawkish" and has suggested that NPEC is more closely aligned with Republican administrations, pointing to its support of the first George W. Bush administration, when it praised the nuclear disarmament of Libya and Iraq, as well as the enforcement of export controls. However, NPEC was critical of Bush's second term, including its "overly generous nuclear cooperation with India, weak sanctions against Iran, and winking at potentially dangerous nuclear programs in Egypt, Turkey, Algeria, Tunisia, Morocco, Yemen, and the GCC states."

Russia and Ukraine 
NPEC Executive Director Henry Sokolski has been an active commentator on the dangers posed by Russia's seizure of the Zaporizhzhia Nuclear Power Plant, which he argues has not only "raised the specter of a military-induced Fukushima", but also requires an active reassessment by the Pentagon of the implications of waging war where nuclear plants operate; taking on "a more active role in reviewing US nuclear license applications"; and strengthening guidance on targeting nuclear plants in war. He has also suggested that Russia may be threatening to use nuclear weapons because the war with Ukraine has exposed Russia's military weaknesses and lack of high-tech weaponry.

China nuclear buildup 
In 2021, NPEC published an edited volume, China's Civil Nuclear Sector: Plowshares to Swords? The NPEC report found that China had the capability to produce between 990 and 1,550 warheads by 2030, using the weapons-grade plutonium that could be produced using civilian reactors that were under construction. Contributors to the report included two consecutive United States assistant secretaries of state; Hui Zhang of Harvard University's Project on Managing the Atom; and many others. The report was cited and discussed widely in publications such as Reuters, the Bulletin of the Atomic Scientists, and Popular Mechanics. In January 2022, the Bulletin of the Atomic Scientists published "A China–US war in space: The after-action report" by Henry Sokolski, which analyzed a three-move space war game carried out by NPEC, with support from current and former officials of the Departments of State and Defense, as well as members of the intelligence community and space industry.

Other issues 
Sokolski has testified before Congress on numerous occasions on various nuclear issues, including civilian nuclear cooperation agreements (sometimes known as 123 agreements). In a March 21, 2018 hearing before the House Foreign Affairs Committee, Sokolski stated, "Failure to require Riyadh to forswear enriching or reprocessing in the text of a US-Saudi nuclear agreement (either by excluding this condition or proposing to put a sunset on it) risks pouring kerosene on the embers of nuclear proliferation already present in the Middle East."

Principals 

Executive Director Henry D. Sokolski has run the NPEC since 1994. A former Pentagon official, Sokolski served as deputy for nonproliferation under Paul Wolfowitz from 1989 to 1993, when Wolfowitz was Undersecretary of Defense for Policy. He studied with Cold War strategist Albert Wohlstetter at University of Chicago.

NPEC's program advisor Victor Gilinsky has been an independent consultant to NPEC, primarily on nuclear energy matters. From 1975 to 1984, he served as a two-term commissioner of the U.S. Nuclear Regulatory Commission.

Defense policy analyst Gregory S. Jones, publisher of the website Proliferation Matters, has worked with NPEC in the past as a senior research analyst. He has also worked with RAND and Pan Heuristics, and is the author of Reactor-Grade Plutonium and Nuclear Weapons: Exploding the Myths (2018), published by NPEC.

NPEC research fellows have included Zachary Keck in Public Affairs; Robert Zarate; Thomas Riisager in Russian Studies; John Spacapan in Public Affairs; and Carly Kinsella.

Recent publications 
Books and articles by NPEC-affiliated authors:
 Keck, Zachary (2022). Atomic Friends: How America Deals With Nuclear-Armed Allies. Rowman and Littlefield.
 Gilinsky, Victor and Sokolski, Henry D. (October 2019). "The Nonproliferation Gold Standard: The New Normal?", Arms Control Today, 49(8):12–15.
 Sokolski, Henry, ed. (2014). Moving Beyond Pretense: Nuclear Power and Nonproliferation. Strategic Studies Institute and U.S. Army War College Press.
Books and reports published by NPEC:

 Sokolski, Henry, ed. (2021). Peering into Our Nuclear Future: Selected Writings of Victor Gilinsky. Nonproliferation Policy Education Center.

References

External links
 Nonproliferation Policy Education Center – organization website

Non-profit organizations based in Washington, D.C.
Nuclear proliferation
Nuclear weapons policy